Bremirehoull is a settlement on the island of Mainland, in Shetland, Scotland. Bremirehoull is situated on the A970 in the Cunningsburgh area.

References

External links

Canmore - Bremirehoull site record
Canmore - Bremirehoull site record

Villages in Mainland, Shetland